Cacotherapia interalbicalis is a species of snout moth in the genus Cacotherapia. It was described by Ragonot in 1891, from Sonora, Mexico. It is also found in the southern United States.

References

Cacotherapiini
Moths described in 1891